Glenn Kweh Jia Jin (born 26 March 2000) is a Singaporean professional footballer who plays as a forward for Singapore Premier League club Tampines Rovers and the Singapore national team.

Club career

Early career
Glenn was the captain of the Home United U-14 team and also played for the National Football Academy’s U-15 team. Glenn was also nominated for the Dollah Kassim Award in 2015.

Young Lions
Glenn signed with the Singapore Premier League club Young Lions in 2021. Glenn scored on his debut just three minutes after coming on in a league match against Hougang United on 17 April 2021. He appeared only 10 times, only three of which being starts in the 2021 SPL season.

International career
He is a former Singapore under-15 international.

Glenn was first called up to the national team in 2022, for the friendly against Kuwait on 1 June 2022 and the AFC Asian Cup Qualifiers against Kyrgyzstan, Tajikistan, and Myanmar on 8, 11, and 14 June 2022 respectively. Glenn made his international debut on 1 June 2022 against Kuwait in the 60th minute, replacing Ikhsan Fandi.

Personal life
Glenn served his National Service (NS) obligations for the Singapore Armed Forces (SAF) from 2019 to 2021 where he completed his Specialist Cadet School (SCS) after his Basic Military Training (BMT).

Career statistics

Club

Young Lions are ineligible for qualification to AFC competitions in their respective leagues.

International

International caps

U23 International caps

U23 International goals

U16 International caps

References

2000 births
Living people
Singaporean footballers
Victoria School, Singapore alumni
Victoria Junior College alumni
Association football defenders
Singapore Premier League players
Young Lions FC players
Singaporean sportspeople of Chinese descent
Competitors at the 2021 Southeast Asian Games
Southeast Asian Games competitors for Singapore